Declan Joseph O'Scanlon Jr. (born June 9, 1963) is an American politician who has served in the New Jersey Senate since 2018, representing the 13th Legislative District. A member of the Republican Party, he previously served in the New Jersey General Assembly from 2012 to 2018. Prior to the 2011 redistricting, O'Scanlon represented the 12th Legislative District in the Assembly from 2008 to 2012.

Early life 
O'Scanlon was born in Marlboro Township and resides in Little Silver. He served on the Little Silver Borough Council from 1994 to 2007 and also served as the borough's police commissioner. O'Scanlon graduated with dual bachelor's degrees from Monmouth University (a BA and a BS), majoring in Psychology and Finance. He is the chief executive officer of FSD Enterprises LLC of Red Bank. The company is a wireless telecommunications consulting and public relations firm he founded in 1995. FSD specializes in helping bring together elected officials and wireless industry representatives to promote mutually agreeable solutions to wireless infrastructure siting. FSD's areas of expertise include municipal wireless ordinance construction, current wireless technology and future trends and municipal bidding for wireless infrastructure locations.

New Jersey Assembly 
Running together with Jennifer Beck, O'Scanlon lost the very close Assembly election held on November 8, 2005. As of December 6, 2005, Beck was declared winner of one of the seats, and was the top vote getter in the District with 31,421 votes. Freshman Democratic Assemblyman Michael J. Panter won re-election with 30,473 votes, narrowly edging O'Scanlon, who had 30,400 votes, just 73 fewer than Panter. One-term incumbent Robert Lewis Morgan lost his bid for re-election, coming in fourth with 30,257 votes. In a partial rematch of 2005, O'Scanlon and his Republican running mate Caroline Casagrande defeated incumbent Panter and future Monmouth County Freeholder Amy Mallet in the 2007 General Assembly election. O'Scanlon and Casagrande received 25.6% and 25.5% of the vote respectively while Panter and Mallet got 25.0% and 23.9% respectively. O'Scanlon is known for advocating the improvement for drivers who travel on the state's roads. He was staunchly opposed to the state's red light camera program and has proposed legislation to increase fines for those caught misusing passing lanes, increasing the state's speed limit, and removing the state ban on self-service gas stations.

New Jersey Senate 
After incumbent District 13 Senator Joe Kyrillos announced he would not seek re-election for 2017, O'Scanlon was nominated by the Republicans to succeed him in the general election. O'Scanlon was initially to face fellow Assembly member Amy Handlin for Kyrillos' seat in the Republican primary, but Handlin ultimately dropped her bid. He subsequently won the seat in the 2017 election, defeating Democratic candidate Sean Byrnes by a 34,782 to 28,353 margin, and began serving in the Senate in 2018. O'Scanlon was succeeded in the Assembly by Republican Serena DiMaso.

During the 2019 budget fight, Democrats contradicted Governor Phil Murphy and passed a budget with no millionaires tax. O'Scanlon, alongside six other Republicans, voted for the budget.

Committees 
Committee assignments for the current session are:
Joint Budget Oversight
Joint Committee on the Public Schools
Budget and Appropriations
Law and Public Safety

District 13
Each of the 40 districts in the New Jersey Legislature has one representative in the New Jersey Senate and two members in the New Jersey General Assembly. The representatives from the 13th District for the 2022—23 Legislative Session are:
Senator Declan O'Scanlon (R)
Assemblywoman Vicky Flynn (R)
Assemblyman Gerard Scharfenberger (R)

Electoral history

Senate

Assembly District 13

Assembly District 12

References

External links
Assemblyman O'Scanlon's legislative webpage, New Jersey Legislature
New Jersey Legislature financial disclosure forms - 2018 2017 2016 2015 2014 2013 2012  2011 2010 2009 2008 2007
Assembly Member Declan Joseph O'Scanlon Jr., Project Vote Smart

1963 births
Living people
Republican Party New Jersey state senators
Monmouth University alumni
New Jersey city council members
Republican Party members of the New Jersey General Assembly
People from Little Silver, New Jersey
People from Marlboro Township, New Jersey
Politicians from Monmouth County, New Jersey
21st-century American politicians